This list compiles the names of Parliament of Lebanon members who were elected in June 2005.
The Parliament of Lebanon has 128 members who are classified according to confession.

Changes during the legislature:
 Edmond Naim, who died in office, was replaced with Pierre Daccache.
 Gebran Tueni, victim of assassination, was replaced by his father Ghassan Tueni.
 Pierre Gemayel and Walid Eido, both assassinated, were replaced in a 2007 by-election by Camille Khoury and Mohammed Amin el Itani.
 Antoine Ghanem, assassinated in September 2007, was not replaced until the June 2009 regularly scheduled parliamentary election ushered in his successor.

Members

See also 
 2005 Lebanese general election
 Members of the 2009–2013 Lebanese Parliament

Sources 

2005
2005 in Lebanon
2006 in Lebanon
2007 in Lebanon
2008 in Lebanon
2009 in Lebanon